Colin's Crest (also known as Colin's Crest Arena) is a spectacular jump of the Rally Sweden in Värmland. Introduced first in 2008, it is designed as a snowy tribute to the 1995 World Rally Champion Colin McRae.

Colin's Crest Award
As a mark of respect for Colin McRae, the Rally Sweden organisers set up an award for the longest jump over a crest on the Vargåsen stage of the rally.

Gallery

References

External links
 

2008 establishments in Sweden
Swedish Rally
Värmland